Pio Vennettilli (29 October 1927 – 6 July 1976) was an Italian sprint canoer who competed in the early 1950s. He was eliminated in the heats of the K-2 1000 m event at the 1952 Summer Olympics in Helsinki.

References

Pio Vennettilli's profile at Sports Reference.com
Report on Italian Olympic canoeists 

1927 births
1976 deaths
Canoeists at the 1952 Summer Olympics
Italian male canoeists
Olympic canoeists of Italy
20th-century Italian people